Jesse Branch (born February 1, 1941) is a former American football player, coach, and college athletics administrator. He served as the head football coach at Southwest Missouri State  University – now Missouri State University – from 1986 to 1994, and Henderson State University from 2001 through 2004, compiling an overall college football record of 67 wins, 75 losses, and one tie.  Branch also was the associate athletic director at the University of Arkansas from 1995 until 2000.

Head coaching record

References

External links
 Missouri State profile

1941 births
Living people
American football halfbacks
American players of Canadian football
Arkansas Razorbacks athletic directors
Arkansas Razorbacks football coaches
Arkansas Razorbacks football players
Calgary Stampeders players
Canadian football running backs
Edmonton Elks players
Henderson State Reddies football coaches
Kansas State Wildcats football coaches
Mississippi State Bulldogs football coaches
Missouri State Bears football coaches
Oregon Ducks football coaches
Sportspeople from Pine Bluff, Arkansas